Nicholas Ihua-Maduenyi (born October 28, 1998), widely known as PsychoYP, is a Nigerian alternative hip hop rapper, singer, and songwriter. He is a member of the music collective Apex Village. He came into the music scene with a critically acclaimed mixtape, YPSZN, which earned him a nomination at the SAMAs, and the Headies for his second mixtape album YPSZN2. Dubbed the "The Fresh Prince of Nigerian Rap", he is regarded as one of Nigeria's rap music pioneers in the alté music scene.

Early life

Ihua-Maduenyi was born on 28 October 1998 in Abuja, and comes from Rivers State. While in secondary school in 2013, he met with Kuddi Is Dead, a member of Apex Village. In an interview with OkayAfrica, he said "as a kid, I was always around music. My mum would play Nigerian music, music from other African countries, and foreign music. I like to think she played a big role in putting me on this path by being in love with music. We'd have P-Square, Michael Jackson, Drake, and Lil Wayne (to name a few) on repeat every weekend. My two siblings and I all had experience with singing and rapping, but something about it just kept me going".

Career
YP is an acronym for "Yung Papi". In 2016, he launched his music career as a rapper on SoundCloud as Psycho, while based in Manchester, England, and went on to release his EP "Lost In The Sauce" on 26 August, 2016. In the following year, YP and Kuddi is Dead released a collaborative 4-track EP "This Is What You Wanted" on 21 May 2017, and released a SoundCloud exclusive with "This Is What You Wanted II" on 21 February, 2018, featuring Ayüü, Zilla Oaks, and Marv OTM. On  8 June 2018, he released "YPSZN", with guest appearances from Fasina, Marv OTM, Denzel Oaks, Zilla Oaks, and Remy Baggins. The project spawned the hit track "Oga".

On the 28 October, 2018, he released a music video for Oga, directed by Kuddi is Dead, and Lekinson. On 22 March 2019, he released "Oga (remix)" featuring Blaqbonez, and Ycee. On the 4th of November, 2019, he released "YPSZN2", with guest appearances from BOJ, Terri, Nathalie Sade, Dami Oniru, Ayüü, Zilla Oaks, Ladipoe, Skales, and Blaqbonez. On the 12th of November, 2020, YP and Azanti went on to release their self-titled debut EP "YP & Azanti, Vol. 1". The extended play spawned the minor hit tracks "Caro", and "Focused". On the 11th of March, 2021, the official music video for "Caro" was released, directed by Cindy Ihua, and produced through Ceeander Entertainment, and Legacy Films.

On 26 August 2021, YP released his first solo EP Euphoria, with guest appearances from Trill Tega, Rasstokyo, J Molley, PatricKxxLee, and Alpha P. On 20 December 2021, he headlined his first Lagos concert at Hard Rock Cafe in Nigeria, featuring guest appearances from Blaqbonez, Dremo, Laycon, Wurld, Alpha P, Terry Apala, Laime, Mojo, SGaWD, King Perryy, and many more. In 2022, he released his third mixtape album YPSZN3 on 2 November. The mixtape album's lead singles include "Bando Diaries", "IC3", and "Stronger", which features a guest vocal from Zlatan. On 8 November 2022, YPSZN3 debuted on the newly launched Nigeria TurnTable Top 50 chart at number 26.

Artistry
PsychoYP is known for fusing Afrobeats, Afroswing, Hip hop, Trap, Grime, Drill and R&B, to create his musical element. In high school, his friends began calling him Yung Papi, and "Papi Chulo". Nicholas eventually picked up "Yung Papi" as an acronym for YP, before adopting Psycho, from a movie he watched to form the stage name PsychoYP. Nicholas "PsychoYP" cited the Nigerian rapper M.I, and the American rappers Drake, Lil Wayne, and Gucci Mane, as his musical influence and/or inspiration while growing up.

Discography

EPs

Collaborative EPs

Mixtapes

Singles

As lead artist

Awards and nominations

References 

Living people
1998 births
Nigerian musicians
Nigerian hip hop singers
Nigerian male rappers
Nigerian hip hop musicians
Nigerian rappers